In Hinduism, Uchchaihshravas ( or , "long-ears" or "neighing aloud") is a seven-headed flying horse, created during the churning of the milk ocean. It is considered the best of horses, the prototype and the king of the horses. Uchchaihshravas is often described as a vahana ("vehicle") of Indra (the king of the gods), but is also recorded to be the horse of Bali, the king of the asuras (demons). Uchchaihshravas is said to be snow white in colour.

Literature

Mahabharata 

The Mahabharata mentions that Uchchaihshravas rose from the Samudra Manthana ("churning of the milk ocean") and Indra—the god-king of heaven—seized it and made it his vehicle (vahana). The stallion rose from the ocean along with other treasures like goddess Lakshmi - the goddess of fortune, who chose Vishnu as her consort, and the amrita - the elixir of life. The legend of Uchchaihshravas, rising from the milk ocean, also appears in the Vishnu Purana, the Ramayana, the Matsya Purana, the Vayu Purana etc. While various scriptures give different lists of treasures (ratnas) of those appeared from the churning of the ocean of milk, most of them agree that Uchchaihshravas was one of them.

The Mahabharata also mentions a bet between sisters and wives of Kashyapa - Vinata and Kadru about the colour of Uchchaihshravas's tail. While Vinata—the mother of Garuda and Aruna—said it was white, Kadru said it was black. The loser would have to become a servant of the winner. Kadru told her Naga ("serpent") sons to cover the tail of the horse and thus make it appear as black in colour and thus, Kadru won.

Bhagavad Gita 
Uchchaihshravas is also mentioned in the Bhagavad Gita (10.27, which is part of the Mahabharata), a discourse by god Krishna—an avatar of Vishnu—to Arjuna. When Krishna declares himself to be the source of the universe, he declares that among horses, he is Uchchaihshravas—he who is born from the amrita.

Hariharacaturanga 
The twelfth-century Hariharacaturanga records once Brahma, the creator-god, performed a sacrifice, out of which rose a winged white horse called Uchchaihshravas. Uchchaihshravas again rose out of the cosmic Ocean of Milk and was taken by the king of the demons (Asura) Bali, who used it to attain many impossible things.

Vishnu Purana 
The Vishnu Purana records that when Prithu was installed as the first king on earth, others were also given kingship responsibilities. Uchchaihshravas was then made the king of horses.

Kumarasambhava 
The Kumarasambhava, by Kalidasa, narrates that Uchchaihshravas, the best of horses and symbol of Indra's glory, was robbed by the demon Tarakasura from heaven.

In popular culture
 George Harrison's Dark Horse Records music label uses a logo inspired by Uchchaihshravas.

See also
 List of fictional horses

Notes

References
Dictionary of Hindu Lore and Legend by Anna Dallapiccola

Hindu legendary creatures
Horses in mythology
Indian legendary characters
Mythical many-headed creatures
Horses in Hinduism